Pratima Devi may refer to:

Prathima Devi (Kannada actress) (1932–2021), Indian film actress who worked in Kannada films
Pratima Devi, Hindi actress who worked in Bollywood films from the 1940s to the 1990s including Anokhi Ada (1948 film)
Pratima Devi (painter) (1893–1969), Indian Bengali artist